Alejandro Hugo Gastulo Ramírez (born 28 March 1957 in Lima) is a retired Peruvian professional football defender.

Career
Gastulo made 21 appearances for the Peru national football team, including participation at the 1982 FIFA World Cup. At club level, he played for Universitario de Deportes in Peru.

See also
1982 FIFA World Cup squads

References

1957 births
Living people
Footballers from Lima
Association football defenders
Peruvian footballers
Peru international footballers
1982 FIFA World Cup players
Club Universitario de Deportes footballers
Peruvian Primera División players